Madam Valentino: The Many Lives of Natacha Rambova  is a 1991 biographical book by Michael Morris about the life of American costume designer Natacha Rambova, detailing her early years, work in film, and her relationship with Rudolph Valentino.

References

1991 non-fiction books
American biographies
Biographies about artists